Polynoncus mirabilis is a species of hide beetle in the subfamily Omorginae found in Chile and Argentina.

References

mirabilis
Beetles described in 1987
Insects of South America